Absurdist  may refer to:

 Absurdism, the philosophical theory that life in general is absurd

 Absurdist fiction, a genre of novels, plays, poems, films, etc. in which the characters cannot find any inherent purpose in life
Theatre of the Absurd, Absurdist plays

 Absurdist humour, a synonym of surreal humour

See also

Absurdity, a thing that is unreasonable or absurd